This is a list of the 1987 PGA Tour Qualifying School graduates. 54 players earned their 1988 PGA Tour card through Q-School in 1987. The tournament was played over 108 holes at Pine Lakes Golf Club and Matanzas Golf Club, in Palm Coast, Florida. Those earning cards split the $100,000 purse, with the winner earning $15,000. John Huston was the medallist. Jim Hallet finished in second place. After several attempts in the mid-1980s, Hallet finally made it on to the PGA Tour.

Several former PGA Tour winners entered the tournament trying to regain full-time status. They included Dave Eichelberger, John Fought, Barry Jaeckel, Bobby Cole, and Leonard Thompson. Eichelberger and Thompson were the only ones that were successful. Fought was disqualified in the first round for signing an incorrect scorecard.

Sources:

References 

PGA Tour Qualifying School
Golf in Florida
PGA Tour Qualifying School
PGA Tour Qualifying School